The 2020–21 Big Sky Conference men's basketball season began with practices in October 2020, followed by the start of the 2020–21 NCAA Division I men's basketball season in November. Conference play begins in January 2021 and will conclude in March 2021.

Preseason Awards
Preseason awards were announced by the league office on November 11, 2020.

Preseason men's basketball coaches poll
(First place votes in parenthesis)
 Eastern Washington (9) 99
 Montana (1) 86
 Weber State 73
 Portland State (1) 67
 Northern Colorado 65
 Montana State 60
 Southern Utah 56
 Northern Arizona 34
 Sacramento State 31
 Idaho State 24
 Idaho 10

Preseason men's basketball media poll
(First place votes in parenthesis)
 Eastern Washington (24) 304
 Montana (2) 250
 Northern Colorado (2) 222
 Montana State 200
 Weber State 183
 Southern Utah 173
 Portland State 147
 Northern Arizona 143
 Sacramento State 93
 Idaho State 86
 Idaho 50

Honors
 Preseason Player of the Year: Jacob Davison, Eastern Washington

Conference matrix

All-Big Sky awards

Big Sky men's basketball weekly awards

References